Follow for Now is the debut and only studio album by the American rock band Follow for Now, released in 1991.

Reception 
AllMusic noted that the band may have deserved constant comparisons to Living Colour that it had received from the press, but also noted the influence of Public Enemy and Bad Brains. Critic Rick Anderson concluded that Follow for Now "is a tight, hard, very funky band that stands easily on its own despite obvious influences," and called the album "an auspicious debut." Rolling Stone noted that Follow for Now exhibited "a wide-ranging mastery of rock styles" and found additional influences from Cream, Love, and Anthrax. Another reviewer praised the charismatic vocals of David Ryan Harris and Hendrix-like persona of guitarist Chris Tinsley. The album was also noted for its mix of "R&B, funk, hip hop, a little psychedelia, and a hint of metal."

Reports indicate that producer Matt Sherrod played drums on most of the album and deleted the unconventional drumming of band member Enrique. The album includes a cover of "She Watch Channel Zero?!" by Public Enemy. Follow for Now split before they could record a follow-up to this debut album.

Track listing 

"Holy Moses"
"Temptation"
"Mistreatin' Folks"
"She Watch Channel Zero?!"
"Time"
"Fire 'N Snakes"
"Evil Wheel"
"Ms. Fortune"
"White Hood"
"Trust"
"6's and 7's"
"Milkbone"

Personnel

David Ryan Harris – guitar, vocals
Chris Tinsley – guitar, vocals
Billy Fields – keyboards, vocals
Jamie Turner – bass
Enrique – drums

References

1991 debut albums
Follow for Now albums